Qarah Bolagh (also Romanized as Qarah Bolāgh and Qareh Bolāgh; also known as Mobārakābād and Qarabulāq) is a village in Soltaniyeh Rural District, Soltaniyeh District, Abhar County, Zanjan Province, Iran. At the 2006 census, its population was 1,471, in 360 families.

References 

Populated places in Abhar County